Vance Cemetery is a cemetery at the end of Vance Cemetery Road in Weaverville, North Carolina. The cemetery opened in 1813 when the namesake David Vance, Sr. was buried. His will stated that he was to be buried above his peach orchard. David Vance, Sr. was the grandfather of Zebulon Baird Vance, the Civil War Governor of North Carolina. The cemetery is still functioning today. There are a large number of children buried in the cemetery, victims of the Spanish flu.

References

Cemeteries in North Carolina